Protohermes grandis is a large, colorful species of dobsonfly occurring in China, Japan, Korea, and Taiwan.

References

Corydalidae
Insects of Asia